Ian Michael Roberts (born July 29, 1965) is an American actor, comedian and writer. Roberts is a founding member of the famed Upright Citizens Brigade improv and sketch comedy troupe.

Life and career
Roberts was born in Queens, New York, to parents Don and Penny Roberts, but spent the majority of his childhood in Secaucus, New Jersey, where he moved at age four. Roberts is a 1987 graduate of Grinnell College in Iowa, where he majored in theater. After graduating from college, Roberts moved to Milwaukee and eventually to Chicago where he became involved in improvisational comedy, studying improv under comedy legend Del Close.

In the early 1990s, Roberts and Matt Besser (along with several other Chicago improv comics) would eventually form the Upright Citizens Brigade sketch comedy troupe.  Amy Poehler and Matt Walsh would later join the group, forming the UCB foursome who went on to create their own Comedy Central series and later opened the affiliated Upright Citizens Brigade Theatre in New York and Los Angeles. Both theaters have become well-known hotspots for watching live alternative comedy and improv shows and in recent years have helped launch the careers of many of today's most popular comedians.

Roberts wrote and starred in the limited release film Martin & Orloff, and appeared with memorable supporting roles in films such as Anchorman: The Legend of Ron Burgundy, Bring It On, Talladega Nights: The Ballad of Ricky Bobby, Drillbit Taylor, Reno 911!: Miami and Semi-Pro. On the Upright Citizens Brigade's sketch series on Comedy Central, Roberts was often seen as the UCB Agent Antoine, but also portrayed many other sketch characters such as Steve Youngblood and Astronaut Mike Birchwood. A running joke on the sketch series was that his character (Agent Antoine) was thought by the other UCB Agents (Colby, Trotter, Adair) to be a cyborg despite his constant assertions to the contrary.

Roberts, along with his other UCB castmates, has regularly appeared in sketch comedy segments on Late Night with Conan O'Brien for many years. Roberts also had a recurring character in the sitcom Arrested Development, Dr. Fishman (AKA The Literal Doctor, AKA Dr. Wordsmith), and also returned for several episodes for the show's revived 4th season on Netflix in 2013.

Circa 2002, he voice-acted in Home Movies, a largely improvised cartoon that has since developed a cult following. His character, Tom Wilsonberg, featured in the episode "Stowaway," was an entrepreneur with a gambling addiction and eccentric behavior.

Roberts was one of the additions to the cast of Reno 911! in its final season, playing the role of Sgt. Jack Declan. In 2010. Roberts starred alongside UCB partner Matt Walsh in the Spike TV improvised comedy series Players, which was created by Walsh. Roberts and Walsh starred as two brothers who run a sports bar, the two also directed several episodes on the show. The series ran for one season, concluding on August 14, 2010.

In September 2010, Roberts appeared with Conan O'Brien in a series of commercials promoting O'Brien's new show on TBS. Roberts played the captain of the "Conan Blimp", with O'Brien riding along as a passenger.

Roberts has written several screenplays with writing partner Jay Martel, one of which was recently sold to DreamWorks, with Steven Brill in talks to direct. Roberts and Martel wrote the script for the comedy Get Hard, starring Will Ferrell and Kevin Hart. Roberts and Martel were also the showrunners for all five seasons of the Comedy Central sketch series Key & Peele. They currently are executive producers and showrunners of the 2016 TV Land series Teachers.

Personal life
Roberts lives in Agoura Hills, California with his wife Katie and their two children, Declan and Josie.

Selected filmography
Actor
 Upright Citizens Brigade (1998–2000),  Antoine/Various 
 Bring It On (2000), Sparky Polastri
 Anchorman: The Legend of Ron Burgundy (2004), Stage Manager
 Arrested Development (6 episodes, 2005–2013), The Literal Doctor
 Talladega Nights: The Ballad of Ricky Bobby (2006), Kyle 
 Walk Hard: The Dewey Cox Story (2007), Drug Dealer
 Semi-Pro (2008), Spurs Coach
 Drillbit Taylor (2008), Jim
 Step Brothers (2008), Male Therapist
 I Love You, Man (2009), Venice Boardwalk Jogger
 Reno 911! (main cast, 2009), Sergeant Jack Declan
 Parks and Recreation (2 episodes, 2009–2010), Ian Winston  
 Players (main cast, 2010), Ken Fitzgerald
 Workaholics (1 episode, 2011), Cal
 Key & Peele (2 episodes, 2012–2013)
 Hate Crime, Three
 Community (1 episode, 2013), Coach Jason Chapman
 Brooklyn Nine-Nine (1 episode, 2014), Lucas Wint
 Drunk History (1 episode, 2014), James Madison
 Playing House (5 episodes, 2014–2017), Ian
 Review (1 episode, 2015), Cassius
 Freaks of Nature (2015), Chaz Sr. 
 Teachers (1 episode, 2016), Superintendent Greg
 The House (2017), Driver at College Campus

Writer
 Upright Citizens Brigade (1998–2000) 
 Key & Peele (2012–2015)
 Get Hard (2015)
 Teachers (2016) 
 Craig of the Creek (2018)

References

External links

1965 births
Living people
People from Queens, New York
Male actors from New Jersey
Male actors from New York City
American sketch comedians
American male film actors
American male screenwriters
American male television actors
American television writers
Grinnell College alumni
People from Secaucus, New Jersey
20th-century American male actors
21st-century American male actors
American male television writers
Upright Citizens Brigade Theater performers
Screenwriters from New York (state)
Screenwriters from New Jersey
20th-century American comedians
21st-century American comedians